Vasconcellea quercifolia is a species of shrub or tree in the family Caricaceae. It is found in Argentina, Peru, Brazil, Paraguay, Uruguay, Bolivia and Ecuador.

References

quercifolia
Trees of Peru
Trees of Bolivia